East Wittering or East Wittering and Bracklesham is a civil parish in the Chichester district of West Sussex, England. The parish lies on the coast of the Manhood Peninsula, approximately six miles (9.6 km) southwest of Chichester. It comprises the built up areas of Bracklesham and the eastern half of East Wittering, the western half of which lies within the boundary of West Wittering civil parish. 
To the east of Bracklesham used to be East Thorney, a detached portion of East Wittering  separated from the body of the parish by a very narrow strip of Earnley. East Thorney is now under the sea off Bracklesham.

Landmarks
The Site of Special Scientific Interest Bracklesham Bay is within the parish. It is an area of biological and geological interest.

References

Civil parishes in West Sussex
Chichester District
Beaches of West Sussex